William Lawson Little Jr. (June 23, 1910 – February 1, 1968) was an American professional golfer who also had a distinguished amateur career.

Little was born in Newport, Rhode Island, and lived much of his early life in the San Francisco area, where his father was an Army Colonel stationed at the Presidio of San Francisco. Little was one of the most dominant amateur players in the history of the sport, capturing both the British Amateur and the U.S. Amateur, then regarded as major championships, consecutively in 1934 and 1935. This feat was referred to as the "Little Slam". He remains the only player to have won both titles in the same year more than once. Little's winning margin of 14 and 13 in the 1934 British final remains the record for dominance. Bob Dickson, Harold Hilton and Bobby Jones are the only other golfers to have won the two titles in the same year.

Little attended Stanford University and is a member of the Stanford Athletic Hall of Fame. He won the James E. Sullivan Award for outstanding amateur athlete in 1935. Little was a student of golf instructor Ernest Jones.

Little turned professional in April 1936, and he won eight times on the PGA Tour including one professional major, the 1940 U.S. Open. Little spent much of his early professional career traveling the country with Bobby Jones and fellow golfers Horton Smith, Jimmy Thomson, and Harry Cooper with the intentions of growing the game of golf in a Spaulding-sponsored effort called The Keystones of Golf. He carried up to 26 clubs in his bag, and this prompted the United States Golf Association to introduce the 14-club limit in 1938. 

Little raised his family in a house that sat on Fairway One of the Pebble Beach golf course and stayed actively involved in the golf world well into his twilight years. He was an active sports writer for many publications and would hold golf clinics at the Masters and Crosby events. Little died in Monterey, California, in 1968 at the age of 57. He was inducted into the World Golf Hall of Fame in 1980.

Amateur Record (19 wins)
1927 
Western Amateur Championship - Qualified Championship flight, defeated first round by Chick Evens
1928
Winner Northern California Amateur Championship (2 months before 18th birthday)
Winner Presidio Golf Club Championship
1929
Winner and Medalist Presidio Golf Club Championship
Winner Orinda Country Club Fourth of July Invitational
Quarter-finalist U.S. Amateur Championship at Pebble Beach (1st National Amateur) 
1930
Medalist California State Amateur Championship at Pebble Beach
Quarter-finalist California State Amateur Championship, defeated by winner, Francis Brown
Defeated 2nd round U.S. Amateur Championship by Gene Holmans, runner-up to Bob Jones
1931
Winner Stanford University Championship
Winner Northern California Championship
Winner Denver, Colorado Invitational Championship (Medal Play)
 Did not qualify U.S. Amateur at Beverly C.C. Chicago, IL.
1932
Defeated in 1st round U.S. Amateur by medalist, Johnny Fischer.
1933
Winner Pacific Coast Intercollegiate Championship, Pebble Beach, CA
Winner & Medalist Broadmoor Invitational, Colorado Springs, CO
Winner & Medalist Colorado State Amateur Championship, Cherry Hills CC
Winner Stanford University Championship
Runner-up Trans-Mississippi Championship, Colorado Springs, CO
Semi-finalist U.S. Amateur (defeated Sandy Summerville, the Champion, in quarter-finals, was defeated by eventual winner, Geo Dunlap)
1934
Winner 8&6 U.S. Walker Cup with partner Johnny Goodman
Winner 6&5 U.S. Walker Cup singles vs. No.2 Cyril Tolley
Winner British Amateur Championship at Prestwick Golf Club by record margin 14&15
Low Amateur in U.S. Open
Winner Northern California Open
Winner Pacific Coast Intercollegiate Championship
Winner U.S. Amateur Championship, defeated David Goodwin 8&7 at The Country Club in Brookline, MA 
1935
Low Amateur Masters. Finished 6th. Score 288
Low Amateur British Open. Finished 4th. Score 289 (Set Amateur course record of 69 at Muirfield Golf Club, Scotland)
Winner British Amateur Championship at Royal Lytham & St Annes Golf Club, Lancashire, England. 1 up (Second year in a row)
Winner U.S. Amateur Championship at The Country Club in Cleveland, OH. 4&2. (Second year in a row)

Professional wins

PGA Tour wins (8)
1936 (1) Canadian Open
1937 (2) Shawnee Open, San Francisco National Match Play Open
1940 (2) U.S. Open, Los Angeles Open
1941 (1) Texas Open
1942 (1) Inverness Invitational Four-Ball (with Lloyd Mangrum)
1948 (1) St. Petersburg Open

Professional major championship is shown in bold.

Other wins
1934 Northern California Open (as an amateur)

Major championships

Professional wins (1)

1 Defeated Sarazen in an 18-hole playoff - Little 70 (−2), Sarazen 73 (+1).

Amateur wins (4)

Results timeline
Amateur

Professional

LA = low amateur
NT = no tournament
WD = withdrew
CUT = missed the half-way cut
DNQ = did not qualify for match play portion of U.S. Amateur
R64, R32, R16, QF, SF = round in which player lost in match play
"T" indicates a tie for a place

Sources: Masters, U.S. Open and U.S. Amateur, British Open

Summary

Most consecutive cuts made – 13 (1940 Masters – 1948 PGA)
Longest streak of top-10s – 2 (three times)

U.S. national team appearances
Amateur
Walker Cup: 1934 (winners)

See also
List of golfers with most PGA Tour wins

References

External links

American male golfers
Stanford Cardinal men's golfers
PGA Tour golfers
Winners of men's major golf championships
World Golf Hall of Fame inductees
Golfers from Rhode Island
Golfers from San Francisco
James E. Sullivan Award recipients
Sportspeople from Newport, Rhode Island
1910 births
1968 deaths